This is a list of lighthouses in North Carolina.

Notes
A. A replica of the 1877 lighthouse was built in 2004.
B. In 2003, a replica of the original 1866 lighthouse was built.

References

North Carolina
Lighthouses
Lighthouses